Delmar School District is a school district headquartered in Delmar, Delaware.

In 2009 the district had over 11 administrators.

In 2015 David Ring, the previous superintendent, left for Baltimore due to proximity with family, and Charity Phillips became the new superintendent.

Schools
The district operates secondary schools only, both in one building.
 Delmar High School
 Delmar Middle School

The current facilities opened in 2000. The funds to build the middle and high school were to come from the Delaware state government.

Students attend Delmar Elementary School in Delmar, Maryland as per an agreement with the Wicomico County Public Schools. Prior to 2000 6th graders went to Maryland.

References

External links
 Delmar School District

School districts in Delaware
Education in Sussex County, Delaware
Education in Wicomico County, Maryland